Jaroslav Levinský and Michal Mertiňák were the defending champions, but did not participate together this year.   Levinský partnered František Čermák, finishing runner-up.   Mertiňák partnered Petr Pála, losing in the first round.

Michael Kohlmann and Alexander Waske won the title, defeating František Čermák and Jaroslav Levinský 7–6(7–5), 4–6, [10–5] in the final.

Seeds

Draw

Draw

External links
Draw

Doubles